Anthony Martinez may refer to:

Anthony Martinez (politician) (born 1963), Belizean politician
Anthony Martinez (drummer)
Anthony Martinez, victim of serial killer Joseph Edward Duncan